Kiyoshi "Kiyo" Tanabe (born 22 April 1948) is a Japanese former professional tennis player.

Born in Hyōgo Prefecture, Tanabe represented Japan in four Davis Cup ties during the 1970s. 

Tanabe, who played collegiate tennis for Oral Roberts University, won two first round matches at the Australian Open, including in 1974 when he upset 16th seed John Cooper.

See also
List of Japan Davis Cup team representatives

References

External links
 
 
 

1948 births
Living people
Japanese male tennis players
Sportspeople from Hyōgo Prefecture
20th-century Japanese people